Alvin M. Ulbrickson (1903 – November 7, 1980), also known as Al Ulbrickson Sr., was an American rower and coach.

After rowing as a student at the University of Washington (UW), Ulbrickson went on to coach the crew there from 1927 until retiring in 1959. His UW crews won six Intercollegiate Rowing Association championships; four of those times they won varsity, junior varsity and freshman titles in the same year. He also coached gold medal-winning U.S. rowing teams in the 1936 (Berlin) and 1948 (London) Olympics, also taking a bronze in 1952 (Helsinki). He was one of five coaches who were charter members of UW Athletic Hall of Fame when it was established in 1979.

He was the father of Alvin Edmund Ulbrickson (Al Ulbrickson Jr.).

References

1903 births
1980 deaths
American male rowers
University of Washington alumni
Washington Huskies men's rowing coaches